Giambattista Gelli (1498–1563) was a Florentine man of letters, from an artisan background. Gelli was a shoemaker, and he used to publish dialogues. He is known for his works of the 1540s, Capricci del bottaio and La Circe, which are ethical and philosophical dialogues. Other works were the plays La sporta (1543) and L'errore (1556). He became a member of the Accademia degli Umidi on 25 December 1540. 

In his historical writings, Gelli was influenced by the late 15th-century forgeries of Annio da Viterbo, which purported to provide evidence from ancient texts to show that Tuscany had been founded by Noah and his descendants after the Deluge.

Works
 L'apparato et feste nelle nozze dello Illustrissimo Signor Duca di Firenze et della Duchessa sua Consorte, 1539;
 Egloga per il felicissimo giorno 9 di gennaio nel quale lo Eccellentissimo Signor Cosimo fu fatto Duca di Firenze, 1542;
 La sporta, 1543;
 Dell'origine di Firenze, 1544;
 I capricci del bottaio, 1546-1548;
 La Circe, 1549;
 Ragionamento sopra la difficultà di mettere in regole la nostra lingua, 1551;
 Lo errore, 1556;
 Polifila, 1556.

External links

References 

1498 births
1563 deaths
Italian Renaissance humanists